Clémence Corminboeuf (born 1977) is a Swiss chemist who is Professor of Computational chemistry at the École Polytechnique Fédérale de Lausanne. She was awarded the Swiss Chemical Society 2021 Heilbronner-Hückel Award.

Early life and education 
Corminboeuf earned her bachelor's and master's degrees at the University of Geneva. She moved to Canada for her master's research, where she studied at the National Research Council Canada Steacie Institute for Molecular Sciences. She worked at both the Dresden University of Technology and the University of Geneva for her graduate studies, where she developed quantum chemical approaches to better calculate nuclear magnetic resonance of organometallic compounds. After completing her doctorate, Corminboeuf was awarded a Swiss National Science Foundation fellowship to move to New York University, where she investigated the catalytic mechanisms of zinc-dependent histone deacetylases using molecular models of how the deacetylation reaction is impacted by histone-deacetylase-like proteins. She moved to the University of Georgia to work in the laboratory of Paul von Ragué Schleyer.

Research and career 
In 2007, Corminboeuf was appointed tenure-track Assistant Professor at the École Polytechnique Fédérale de Lausanne (EPFL), and was promoted to full Professor in 2019. Corminboeuf works on theoretical predictions of electronic structure for catalytic and organic electronic materials. She was involved with the development of several quantum chemical approaches to predicting material properties. She serves on the Executive Committee of MARVEL, a Swiss National Science Foundation programme that looks to accelerate the computational design of new materials.

Corminboeuf developed the Density Overlap Regions Indicator (DORI), which allows the prediction of bonding and non-covalent interactions between molecular systems. She has made use of machine learning to understand the material properties of large systems that consist of non-covalent interactions, such as Van der Waals forces, halogen bonds and carbon-hydrogen-π  interactions.

Corminboeuf is a member of the Young Academy of Europe. In 2021 Corminboeuf was awarded the Heilbronner-Hückel Lectureship Award.

Awards and honours 
 2010 European Young Chemists' Network Silver Medal
 2012 European Research Council Starting Grant
 2014 Swiss Chemical Society Werner Prize
 2018 American Chemical Society Early-Career Award in Theoretical Chemistry
 2018 European Research Council Consolidator Grant
 2020 University of Geneva Prix Jaubert
 2021 Swiss Chemical Society Heilbronner-Hückel Lectureship Award

Selected publications

References 

Swiss chemists
Swiss women chemists
Academic staff of the École Polytechnique Fédérale de Lausanne
University of Geneva alumni
1977 births
Living people